Prasenjit Ganguly (born 20 April 1976) is an Indian former cricketer. He played three first-class matches for Bengal between 1996 and 1998.

See also
 List of Bengal cricketers

References

External links
 

1976 births
Living people
Indian cricketers
Bengal cricketers
People from Hooghly district